The Free and Open Source Software Conference India (FossCon India) is planned to be an annual, three days conference for the discussion and promotion of the Free and open-source software.

History

Locations

 Belagavi, India - Started in 2019

Keynote Speakers

See also

References

External links
FOSSCON INDIA
Fosscon India Facebook 
Fosscon India (@fosscon) Instagram 

Free-software conferences
Academic conferences
International conferences in India